Lepidomys costipunctata is a species of snout moth in the genus Lepidomys. It was described by Hans Georg Amsel in 1956 and is known from Venezuela (including the type location of Maracay).

References

Moths described in 1956
Chrysauginae